Einasleigh is a town and a locality in the Shire of Etheridge, Queensland, Australia.

Geography 
The town is located at the confluence of Einasleigh River with the Copperfield River. The Einasleigh River descends  over its  course.

History
The indigenous people of Einasleigh were the Ewamin.

Einasleigh Provisional School opened on 29 October 1901. It closed in 1905 but reopened in 1906. On 1 January 1909, it became Einasleigh State School. It closed in 1955. It was at 5-7 First Street.

Einasleigh Post Office opened by May 1909 (a receiving office had been open from 1900) and closed in 1993.

Wirra Wirra Provisional School opened on 1914. On 1 December 1914, it became Wirra Wirra State School. It closed circa 1918.

Heritage listings 
Einasleigh has a number of heritage-listed sites, including:
 Daintree Road: Einasleigh Copper Mine and Smelter
 Daintree Street: Einasleigh Hotel
 Etheridge railway line: Einasleigh railway station and Station Master's Residence

References

External links

 
 Town map, 1973

 
Towns in Queensland
Shire of Etheridge
Localities in Queensland